Jasaitis is a Lithuanian language family name. It may refer to:
Simas Jasaitis, Lithuanian professional basketball player
Karolis Jasaitis, Lithuanian football player 
Jurgis Jasaitis, Lithuanian "knygnešys" or book smuggler and rebel against Tsarist rule

 
Lithuanian-language surnames